Jason J. Lewis (born June 28, 1976 in Torrance, California) is an American voice actor, best known for voicing Superman and other DC Comics characters on the Cartoon Network series Justice League Action.

Filmography

Film

Television

Video games

References

External links
 

Living people
American male voice actors
1976 births
American male video game actors
20th-century American male actors
21st-century American male actors